The EZ-Link card is a rechargeable contactless smart card and electronic money system that is primarily used as a payment method for public transport such as bus and rail lines in Singapore. A standard EZ-Link card is a credit-card-sized stored-value contact-less smart-card that comes in a variety of colours, as well as limited edition designs. It is sold by TransitLink Pte Ltd, a subsidiary of the Land Transport Authority (LTA), and can be used on travel modes across Singapore, including the Mass Rapid Transit (MRT), the Light Rail Transit (LRT), public buses which are operated by SBS Transit, SMRT Buses, Tower Transit Singapore and Go-Ahead Singapore, as well as the Sentosa Express.

Established in 2001, the first generation of the card was based on the Sony FeliCa smart card technology and was promoted as the means for speedier boarding times on the city-state's bus and rail services. It had a monopoly on public transportation fare payments in Singapore until September 2009, when the NETS FlashPay card, which had a monopoly over Electronic Road Pricing (ERP) toll payments, entered the market for transportation payments (and vice versa). EZ-Link cards are distributed and managed by EZ-Link Pte. Ltd., also a subsidiary of Singapore's Land Transport Authority.

In September 2009, CEPAS EZ-Link cards replaced the original EZ-Link card, expanding the card's usage to taxis, ERP gantries (with the dual-mode in-vehicle unit), car parks (which have been upgraded to accept CEPAS-compliant cards), convenience stores, supermarkets and fast food restaurants. Compared to NETS FlashPay however, EZ-Link has lesser acceptance at retail shops. EZ-Link can also be used as a payment card at vending machines throughout the country.

Development
The Land Transport Authority introduced its pilot testing of the card to 100,000 volunteers on 26 February 2000. Initially for commuters who made at least five trips on MRT/LRT per week, the card was branded as the "Super Rider". As an incentive, volunteers were given 10% rebate off their regular fare during the one-month period.

Two further tests were made, with the scheme extending to frequent bus users on selected routes, on an invitation basis.

Uses of the card
The card is commonly used in Singapore as a smartcard for paying transportation fees in the city-state's Mass Rapid Transit (MRT), Light Rail Transit (LRT) and public bus services. The EZ-Link function is also used in concession cards for students in nationally recognised educational institutes, full-time national service personnel serving in the Singapore Armed Forces, Singapore Civil Defence Force and Singapore Police Force or senior citizens who are over 60 years old.

The system is similar to the Pasmo and ICOCA cards, and the card's use have since been expanded to retail, private transport, government services, community services, educational institutes and vending machines.

On 17 October 2007, local telco StarHub and EZ-Link Pte Ltd declared the start of a 6-month trial on phones with an embedded EZ-Link card.

From 2009, Singapore motorists can use ez-link cards in their new generation In-Vehicle Unit to pay for Electronic Road Pricing (ERP) and Electronic Parking System (EPS) payments. In August 2016, EZ-Link introduced a post-paid ERP payment service called EZ-Pay.

In March 2016, EZ-Link concluded a trial with the Land Transport Authority and the Infocomm Development Authority of Singapore on the use of compatible mobile phones with Near-Field Communication (NFC) technology to make public transport payments.

In April 2018, the card also gained acceptance on NETS terminals in hawker centres across Singapore.

In September 2018, the EZ-Link card became part of a unified cashless payment system rolled out at 500 hawker stalls across Singapore.

In April 2019, EZ-Link announced it was working with Touch 'N Go to create a dual currency cross-border card for public transport.

Card Variations
In 2007, the Land Transport Authority (LTA) and the Singapore Tourism Board launched the Singapore Tourist Pass produced by EZ-Link to offer tourists unlimited rides on Singapore's public transport system.

In 2015, EZ-Link introduced 'EZ-Charms', trinkets that have full EZ-Link functionalities, such as the Hello Kitty EZ-Charms, that received overwhelming response.

In 2017, EZ-Link launched EZ-Link Wearables, wearable devices that have full EZ-Link functionalities such as fitness trackers.

System for e-Payments (SeP)
A trial to test the system was held from 29 August to 28 October 2008. The trial, which involved some 5,000 commuters, generated 1.7 million transactions and has confirmed that the system is ready for revenue service. Developed in-house by the LTA, SeP is built on the Singapore Standard for Contactless ePurse Application (CEPAS) which allows any smart card that complies with the standard to be used with the system and in a wide variety of payment applications.

With SeP, commuters were able to use cards issued by any card issuer for transit purposes as long as the card complied with the CEPAS standard and included the transit application. Commuters could eventually use CEPAS-compliant cards for Electronic Road Pricing (ERP) payments in vehicles fitted with the new generation In-vehicle Unit (IU), Electronic Parking System (EPS) carparks and other electronic payment systems that supported the CEPAS standard.

During the free one-for-one exchange exercise, most of them replaced their cards during the direct card replacement exercise in 2009. Others seemed to replace new cards after the old cards were out of value and become collectors' value. The new EZ-Link cards also have a higher storage capacity of S$500.00 instead of the previous S$100.00 limit but most passengers keep to the $100 limit in case of loss of card.

EZ-Link App
The EZ-Link App is a mobile application developed by EZ-Link that is available on the Google Play Store and App Store. It was first released as an Android-exclusive app in 2013 under the name 'My EZ-Link Mobile App', and is used for:

 Topping up of EZ-Link cards and Concession Cards using NFC-enabled Android phones and with debit cards, credit cards and PayLah! as payment options.
 Registering for EZ-Reload, an auto top -up service with Mastercard or Visa credit card. In August 2018, EZ-Link moved the application for EZ-Reload from web-based forms to the EZ-Link app, shortening the approval process to minutes.
 Earning of points when paying with EZ-Link to redeem rewards. From February 2018, EZ-Link card users can get one LinkPoint by NTUC Link for every S$2 spent using EZ-Link at retail stalls.
 Registering for EZ-Pay, a post-paid card-less service for ERP and EPS payments launched in 2016 that removes the hassle of topping up CashCard for motorists in Singapore.
 On-the-go checking of transactions and balance of EZ-Link.
 Blocking of EZ-Link when misplaced and recovering of remaining value.
 QR code payments with EZ-Link Wallet.

EZ-Link Vending Machine
In early September 2019, an EZ-Link merchandise vending machine was introduced at Bugis Junction selling exclusive cards, charms, and other EZ-Link merchandise, such as the Hello Kitty Plush EZ-Charm and the Pusheen the Cat EZ-Link card. The initial introduction was met with very positive response from the public, resulting in long queues during the launch period.

EZ-Link Wallet
On 9 March 2020, EZ-Link launched the EZ-Link Wallet, an e-wallet for mobile phones. Compared to the EZ-Link card which is based on NFC, the EZ-Link Wallet is based on QR code, bypassing the need for payment terminals, relying on smartphones and a printed QR code. It is compliant with the SGQR code system.

An email address and local mobile number are required to register for an EZ-Link account. Users have to top-up the e-wallet with a debit/credit card, and make payments by scanning the QR code at a retail shop and entering the payment amount. Payment can be authorised with either a 6-digit PIN or the phone's fingerprint scanner. Up to 6 debit/credit cards can be saved in the EZ-Link app.

Users can earn EZ-Link Rewards points for each digital wallet transaction, which can be used to redeem vouchers. The EZ-Link Wallet can also be used overseas at an Alipay Connect-enabled merchant in Japan.

Technical data

The EZ-Link card operates on a radio frequency (RF) interface of 13.56 MHz at 212 kbit/s, with the potential for communication speeds in excess of 847 kbit/s. It employs the Manchester bit coding scheme for noise tolerance against distance fluctuation between the card and the contactless reader, and implements the Triple DES algorithm for security.

Pricing
An adult EZ-Link card costs S$12, inclusive of a S$5 non-refundable card cost and a $7 card value.

There was a problem with commuters attempting to evade paying the full fare with the prior magnetic fare card system. Under the EZ-Link system, when users tap their card on the entry card reader, the system deducts the maximum fare payable from their bus stop to the end of the bus route. If they tap their card on the exit reader when they disembark, the system will return an amount based on the remaining bus stages to the end of the bus route. If they fail to tap the card on the exit reader when they disembark, the entry card reader would have already deducted the maximum fare payable to the end of the bus route.

Card top-up
EZ-Link card holders could top up their cards in several ways including General Ticketing Machines at all MRT stations, TransitLink Add Value Machine, TransitLink Ticket Offices, convenience stores, ATM machines, AXS Stations, People's Association Community Clubs and Water Venture Outlets and EZ-Reload.

Card holders used to be able to top up using EZ-Online, an online service provided by EZ-Link. This service allowed commuters to view their past transaction records, download discount coupons onto their cards, pay for shopping using the EZ-Link card at selected online merchants (up to S$100 per transaction), and top up their EZ-Link card online through any connected Sony Felica contactless smart card reader.

In 2013, EZ-Link launched the world's first NFC Mobile Application for EZ-Link card top-ups.

From December 2017 onwards, card holders could top up their EZ-Link card using the EZ-Link App on NFC-enabled phones.

Since August 2018, card holders who link their Mastercard and Visa credit or debit cards to EZ-Reload no longer need to pay convenience fees for their top-ups.

Comparison of payment modes

See also
 List of smart cards

References

External links
 

2001 establishments in Singapore
Contactless smart cards
Fare collection systems
Passenger rail transport in Singapore
Road transport in Singapore
Singaporean culture
Mass Rapid Transit (Singapore)
Singaporean brands